Victor Stjernborg (born May 22, 2003) is a Swedish ice hockey forward for the Växjö Lakers of the SHL. Stjernborg was drafted by the Chicago Blackhawks in the fourth round of the 2021 NHL Entry Draft with the 108th pick in the draft.

Career statistics

International

Awards and honours

References

External links
 

2003 births
Chicago Blackhawks draft picks
Living people
Sportspeople from Malmö
Swedish ice hockey forwards
IF Troja/Ljungby players
Växjö Lakers players